Lauritz Christiansen is the name of

 Lauritz Christiansen (sailor) (1867–1930), Norwegian sailor 
 Lauritz Christiansen (athlete) (1892–1976), Danish long-distance runner